

Final standings
Note: GP = Games played, W = Wins, L = Losses, T = Ties, GF = Goals for, GA = Goals against, Pts = Points.

Playoffs

semi-finals
March 7, 2009: Calgary 9, Strathmore 0
March 7, 2009: Minnesota 4, Edmonton 0

Final WWHL Championship
March 8, 2009: Minnesota 2, Calgary 0

Minnesota Whitecaps won the Championship of the WWHL

Clarkson Cup 2009 
A Canadian Women's Hockey League's team Montreal Stars won the Clarkson Cup''' by defeating  3-1 the Minnesota Whitecaps

Scoring Leaders

Goalie Leaders

References

External links
   Western Women's Hockey League

Western Women's Hockey League seasons
Women